Mahin or Mheen is a town in central Syria, administratively part of the Homs Governorate, south of Homs. It is situated on an oasis in the Syrian Desert, between Sadad to the west and al-Qaryatayn to the east, adjacent to the ancient village of Huwwarin. According to the Central Bureau of Statistics (CBS), Mahin had a population of 11,064 in the 2004 census. Its inhabitants are predominantly Sunni Muslims.

In mid-late 2015, the Islamic State of Iraq and the Levant captured Mahin. The city was regained by the Syrian Army on 29 December 2015 during the late offensive of Homs in 2015.

References

Bibliography

Populated places in Homs District
Towns in Syria